Paul Russell is an American novelist, poet and short story writer. He is a two-time winner of the Ferro-Grumley Award for LGBT fiction, in 2000 for The Coming Storm and in 2012 for The Unreal Life of Sergey Nabokov. The Unreal Life of Sergey Nabokov is a fictionalized portrayal of a real person - Sergey Nabokov, the gay younger brother of Russian novelist Vladimir Nabokov, about whom very little concrete biographical information is known.

Russell grew up in Memphis, Tennessee, where his father Jack was a mathematics professor at Southwestern at Memphis. He studied at Oberlin College and Cornell University. He is a professor of English literature at Vassar College.

Works

Novels
The Salt Point (1990)
Boys of Life (1991)
Sea of Tranquillity (1994)
The Coming Storm (1999)
War Against the Animals (2003)
The Unreal Life of Sergey Nabokov (2012)
Immaculate Blue (2015)

Non-fiction
The Gay 100:  A Ranking of the Most Influential Gay Men and Lesbians, Past and Present (1995)

References

External links
Paul Russell official website

Living people
20th-century American novelists
21st-century American novelists
20th-century American poets
21st-century American poets
American male poets
American male novelists
American gay writers
American LGBT poets
American LGBT novelists
Place of birth missing (living people)
American male short story writers
Vassar College faculty
Writers from Memphis, Tennessee
Year of birth missing (living people)
20th-century American short story writers
21st-century American short story writers
20th-century American male writers
21st-century American male writers
Novelists from New York (state)
Novelists from Tennessee
Gay poets